The 2020 Wyoming State Senate elections will be held as part of the biennial elections in the United States. Wyoming voters will elect state senators in 15 of the 30 state Senate districts. State senators serve four-year terms in the Wyoming State Senate.

Elections for the office of Wyoming State Senate will take place in 2020. The general election will be held on November 3, 2020. A primary is scheduled for August 18, 2020. The filing deadline was May 29, 2020.

Retirements
Four incumbents did not run for re-election in 2020. Those incumbents are:

Republicans
District 10: Glenn Moniz: Retiring
District 18: Hank Coe: Retiring
District 20: Wyatt Agar: Retiring
District 26: Eli Bebout: Retiring

Incumbents defeated

In primary elections

Republicans
One Republicans lost renomination.

District 24: Michael Von Flatern lost renomination to Troy McKeown.

In the general election

Democrats
District 12: Liisa Anselmi-Dalton lost to John Kolb.

Predictions

Results summary

Close races

Summary of results by State Senate District

District 2

Republican primary

General election

District 4

Republican primary

General election

District 6

Republican primary

Democratic primary

General election

District 8

Republican primary

Democratic primary

General election

District 10

Republican primary

Democratic primary

General election

District 12

Democratic primary

Republican primary

General Election

District 14

Republican primary

General election

District 16

Republican primary

General Election

District 18

Republican primary

General election

District 20

Republican primary

Democratic primary

General election

District 22

Republican primary

General election

District 24

Republican primary

General election

District 26

Republican primary

General election

District 28

Republican primary

General election

District 30

Republican primary

General election

See also
2020 United States Senate election in Wyoming
2020 United States presidential election in Wyoming
2020 United States House of Representatives election in Wyoming

References

External links
 
 
  (State affiliate of the U.S. League of Women Voters)
 

state senate
Wyoming Senate
Wyoming State Senate elections